Pori is a 2007 Indian Tamil-language action comedy film directed by Subramaniam Siva, who rendered his debut Thiruda Thirudi, a 2004 runaway blockbuster. The film stars Jiiva and Pooja. The film was later dubbed into Hindi under the title Naya Zalzala and released in 2011. The film met with negative reviews and turned out to be a box office bomb.

Plot
Hari (Jiiva) is an unemployed youth who runs a pavement book shop in Tripiclane area. His father (Nagesh), an upright retired schoolteacher, buys him a shop in a building with his PF money. He names it "Periyar Bookshop" and runs it with his friends (Karunas and Ganeshkar). Meanwhile, he constantly bumps into a TV reporter Pooja (Pooja), and a love-hate relationship happens. One day, a Malaysian-based businessman named Mahadevan (Seeman) comes and evicts Hari from the shop, claiming that it belongs to him. Hari now discovers that his father was cheated by a land mafia gang which specializes in forged documents and is hand-in-glove with revenue officials. He decides to take the gauntlet and unveil the evil forces behind the property grabbers. Soon, he discovers that Nama Shivayam (Sampath Raj), Vinayagam real estates owner, is the brains behind the entire operation. How Hari becomes a one-man army and brings Nama Shivayam to justice forms the rest of the story.

Cast

 Jiiva as Hari
 Pooja as Pooja
 Seeman as Mahadevan
 Sampath Raj as Nama Shivayam
 Nagesh as Hari's father
 Karunas as Hari's friend
 Ganeshkar as Hari's friend
 Delhi Ganesh as Pooja's father
 Shanmugarajan as Police Inspector
 Jagan as himself
 Kanal Kannan as Special appearance
 Daisy Shah as Item dancer (Special appearance)

Production
The film was initially announced in December 2005 with Jiiva and Nila starring, before the latter was replaced by Pooja.

Soundtrack
Soundtrack was composed by Dhina and lyrics by Yugabharathi.

Reception

Pori received negative reviews from critics. A critic from Nowrunning.com rated the film 1/5, stating that "If you have all the time in the world to do nothing else, go watch Pori. A seriously depressing movie with absolute lack of comedy, story line, good music and everything which goes into making a good movie." Sify wrote "There is no script or narrative as the director deploys all cinematic cliches since time immemorial. Six songs at regular intervals that are badly picturised tests your patience. Jeeva has done a larger-than-life role which just does not suit him". Rediff wrote "Watch Pori if you want to aimlessly fritter time away".

References

External links
 

2007 films
2000s Tamil-language films
Films directed by Subramaniam Siva